The 1982 Murjani WTA Championships was a women's tennis tournament played on outdoor clay courts at the Amelia Island Plantation on Amelia Island, Florida in the United States that was part of the 1982 WTA Tour. It was the third edition of the tournament and was held from April 19 through April 25, 1982. First-seeded Chris Evert-Lloyd won the singles title and earned $32,000 first-prize money.

Finals

Singles
 Chris Evert-Lloyd defeated  Andrea Jaeger 6–3, 6–1
 It was Evert's 2nd singles title of the year and the 112th of her career.

Doubles
 Leslie Allen /  Mima Jaušovec defeated  Barbara Potter /  Sharon Walsh 6–1, 7–5
 It was Allen's 2nd doubles title of the year and the 3rd of her career. It was Jaušovec' 2nd doubles title of the year and the 9th of her career.

References

External links
 ITF tournament edition details

Amelia Island Championships
Murjani WTA Championships
Murjani WTA Championships
Murjani WTA Championships
Murjani WTA Championships